Border Reivers, originally known as Scottish Borders Rugby, and also known as The Borders, were one of four professional rugby union teams in Scotland, alongside Edinburgh, Caledonia Reds and Glasgow Warriors.

Border Reivers were active in the Scottish Inter-District Championship from 1996 to 1998 and in the Celtic League, Celtic Cup and Heineken Cup from 2002 until 2007, when, as part of the Scottish Rugby Union's cost-cutting measures, they were disbanded. They played their home matches at Netherdale (capacity circa 6,000) in Galashiels in the Scottish Borders region.

History

The Border Reivers were a continuation of the amateur South of Scotland rugby union team, reshaped as a professional side in 1996.

District sides

Scotland had four district sides: North and Midlands, South, Glasgow District, and Edinburgh District.

The district sides capped the best amateur players from their areas' club sides to play inter-district matches and matches against touring sides. Unlike the Scottish clubs (and Ireland's provincial sides), the Scottish district sides had no settled home and were not members of their Rugby Union. This meant when Scottish rugby embraced professionalism, it was not clear if a model based on districts or clubs would be used.

Professional model: club or district
It was not clear which route professionalism would go in Scotland. This created a turbulent start for professionalism in Scotland and left Scotland far behind fast-embracing Ireland in the set-up of its professional structure. The first season of the Heineken Cup in 1995–96 was run without any Scottish teams in European competition.

The SRU were concerned that the existing and long-established Scottish amateur club sides could not compete against the best teams from France and England and that by professionalising the district sides they would be more capable of advancing Scottish Rugby.

The four amateur district teams – Glasgow, Edinburgh, South of Scotland, and North and Midlands – were to become the professional sides Glasgow Warriors, Edinburgh Rugby, Border Reivers, and the Caledonia Reds, respectively.

Formation of Border Reivers

The Border Reivers were created in 1996 to compete in the Heineken Cup, because the Scottish Rugby Union did not think that Scottish club sides would be able to compete against the best teams from France and England.

Border Reivers and the other three Scottish districts competed in the Scottish Inter-District Championship to determine their European qualifying; the leagues positions determining whether they entered the Heineken Cup or the Challenge Cup.

Merger with Edinburgh Rugby

Then financial difficulties – the SRU's high debt, partly as a result of the redevelopment of Murrayfield – called for retrenchment. After two seasons, financial difficulties forced the Union to merge the four teams into two. The Border Reivers side merged with Edinburgh Rugby to form a team to be known as Edinburgh Reivers, causing outrage with many Border rugby fans, as effectively the Border side was disbanded.

Resurrection

The establishment and early success of a Celtic League caused the SRU to rethink its professional district structure. The Border Reivers side was resurrected in 2002 as The Borders and joined the second season of the Celtic League.

Since their return as a team in 2002, the Borders failed to challenge for the Celtic League title; however, they performed well during the 2005–06, finishing mid-table.

Disbandment again

On 27 March 2007, Scottish Rugby Union announced the Reivers were to disband at the end of the season as a cost-cutting exercise. Many fans and sections of the Scottish media have claimed that the Reivers suffered due to SRU's determination, despite poor crowds and results, to make rugby a success in Glasgow. At the end of the 2006–07 season, several Borders players transferred to Glasgow Warriors. The success Glasgow later achieved with sell out crowds and a Pro 12 title win suggests this was a wise strategy.

Potential revival

Following the decision by the SRU to disband the Borders Reivers, the Border Reivers Action Group was formed to fight against the disbandment.

However, in April 2007, the Borders Rugby Action Group conceded defeat as the SRU insisted there would be no finance available from the governing body. The action group pledged an attempt to resurrect the team in 2008; however, no such attempt was made.

On 19 December 2011, former Scottish internationalist Keith Robertson gave an interview to The Herald newspaper. Robertson claimed that he was in contact with "people in the Borders who are interested in getting involved in funding a professional team". However the interested parties were said to be unwilling to afford any direct shareholding to the SRU. Robertson went on to claim that if the project came to fruition, the team would feature many "Borderers" – an attribute he felt the defunct Border Reivers had lacked.

Records and achievements

Season standings

Competing as Border Reivers unless otherwise stated.
ᵜ Competing as Scottish Borders.
β Competing as The Borders.

League competitions

{| class="wikitable"
|- border=1 cellpadding=5 cellspacing=0
! style="width:80px;"| Season
! style="width:100px;"|Pos
! style="width:20px;"|Pld
! style="width:20px;"|W
! style="width:20px;"|D
! style="width:20px;"|L
! style="width:20px;"|F
! style="width:20px;"|A
! style="width:25px;"|+/-
! style="width:20px;"|BP
! style="width:20px;"|Pts
! |Notes

|- align=center
|  style="text-align:left; background:#ffe6bd;"|1996–97  ᵜ
|  style="text-align:left; background:#ffe6bd;"|3rd
| style="background:#ffe6bd;"|3|| style="background:#ffe6bd;"|1|| style="background:#ffe6bd;"|1|| style="background:#ffe6bd;"|1|| style="background:#ffe6bd;"|59|| style="background:#ffe6bd;"|61|| style="background:#ffe6bd;"|-2|| style="background:#ffe6bd;"|-|| style="background:#ffe6bd;"|3|| style="background:#ffe6bd;"|

|- align=center
|  style="text-align:left; background:#ffe6bd;"|1997–98
|  style="text-align:left; background:#ffe6bd;"|4th
| style="background:#ffe6bd;"|3|| style="background:#ffe6bd;"|0|| style="background:#ffe6bd;"|0|| style="background:#ffe6bd;"|3|| style="background:#ffe6bd;"|34|| style="background:#ffe6bd;"|68|| style="background:#ffe6bd;"|-34|| style="background:#ffe6bd;"|-|| style="background:#ffe6bd;"|0|| style="background:#ffe6bd;"|

|- align=center
|  style="text-align:left; background:;"|1998-2002
|  style="text-align:left; background:;"|-
| style="background:;"|-|| style="background:;"|-|| style="background:;"|-|| style="background:;"|-|| style="background:;"|-|| style="background:;"|-|| style="background:;"|-|| style="background:#;"|-|| style="background:;"|-|| style="background:;"|No Pro Borders Team

|- align=center
|  style="text-align:left; background:#ffe6bd;"|2002–03 β 
|  style="text-align:left; background:#ffe6bd;"|2nd
| style="background:#ffe6bd;"|8|| style="background:#ffe6bd;"|4|| style="background:#ffe6bd;"|0|| style="background:#ffe6bd;"|4|| style="background:#ffe6bd;"|164|| style="background:#ffe6bd;"|224|| style="background:#ffe6bd;"|-60|| style="background:#ffe6bd;"|2|| style="background:#ffe6bd;"|18|| style="background:#ffe6bd;"|

|- align=center
|  style="text-align:left; background:#ffa6aa;"|2002–03 β 
|  style="text-align:left; background:#ffa6aa;"|6th in Pool B
| style="background:#ffa6aa;"|7|| style="background:#ffa6aa;"|2|| style="background:#ffa6aa;"|0|| style="background:#ffa6aa;"|5|| style="background:#ffa6aa;"|142|| style="background:#ffa6aa;"|169|| style="background:#ffa6aa;"|-27|| style="background:#ffa6aa;"|4|| style="background:#ffa6aa;"|12|| style="background:#ffa6aa;"|

|- align=center
|  style="text-align:left; background:#ffa6aa;"|2003–04 β 
|  style="text-align:left; background:#ffa6aa;"|12th
| style="background:#ffa6aa;"|22|| style="background:#ffa6aa;"|4|| style="background:#ffa6aa;"|0|| style="background:#ffa6aa;"|18|| style="background:#ffa6aa;"|363|| style="background:#ffa6aa;"|750|| style="background:#ffa6aa;"|-387|| style="background:#ffa6aa;"|6|| style="background:#ffa6aa;"|22|| style="background:#ffa6aa;"|

|- align=center
|  style="text-align:left; background:#ffa6aa;"|2004–05 β 
|  style="text-align:left; background:#ffa6aa;"|11th
| style="background:#ffa6aa;"|20|| style="background:#ffa6aa;"|3|| style="background:#ffa6aa;"|0|| style="background:#ffa6aa;"|17|| style="background:#ffa6aa;"|337|| style="background:#ffa6aa;"|556|| style="background:#ffa6aa;"|-219|| style="background:#ffa6aa;"|6|| style="background:#ffa6aa;"|18|| style="background:#ffa6aa;"|

|- align=center
|  style="text-align:left; background:#ffa6aa;"|2005–06
|  style="text-align:left; background:#ffa6aa;"|9th
| style="background:#ffa6aa;"|22|| style="background:#ffa6aa;"|7|| style="background:#ffa6aa;"|0|| style="background:#ffa6aa;"|13|| style="background:#ffa6aa;"|386|| style="background:#ffa6aa;"|501|| style="background:#ffa6aa;"|-115|| style="background:#ffa6aa;"|8|| style="background:#ffa6aa;"|44|| style="background:#ffa6aa;"|(All deemed + 2 games: 8 pts)

|- align=center
|  style="text-align:left; background:#ffa6aa;"|2006–07
|  style="text-align:left; background:#ffa6aa;"|11th
| style="background:#ffa6aa;"|20|| style="background:#ffa6aa;"|2|| style="background:#ffa6aa;"|0|| style="background:#ffa6aa;"|18|| style="background:#ffa6aa;"|201|| style="background:#ffa6aa;"|545|| style="background:#ffa6aa;"|-344|| style="background:#ffa6aa;"|4|| style="background:#ffa6aa;"|12|| style="background:#ffa6aa;"|

|}

European competitions

{| class="wikitable"
|- border=1 cellpadding=5 cellspacing=0
! style="width:80px;"| Season
! style="width:100px;"|Pos
! style="width:20px;"|Pld
! style="width:20px;"|W
! style="width:20px;"|D
! style="width:20px;"|L
! style="width:20px;"|F
! style="width:20px;"|A
! style="width:25px;"|+/-
! style="width:20px;"|BP
! style="width:20px;"|Pts
! |Notes

|- align=center
|  style="text-align:left; background:#ffffcc;"|
|  style="text-align:left; background:#ffffcc;"|
| style="background:#ffffcc;"|4|| style="background:#ffffcc;"|1|| style="background:#ffffcc;"|0|| style="background:#ffffcc;"|3|| style="background:#ffffcc;"|80|| style="background:#ffffcc;"|178|| style="background:#ffffcc;"|-98|| style="background:#ffffcc;"|-|| style="background:#ffffcc;"|2|| style="background:#ffffcc;"|

|- align=center
|  style="text-align:left; background:#ffffcc;"|1997–98 
|  style="text-align:left; background:#ffffcc;"|
| style="background:#ffffcc;"|6|| style="background:#ffffcc;"|0|| style="background:#ffffcc;"|0|| style="background:#ffffcc;"|6|| style="background:#ffffcc;"|129|| style="background:#ffffcc;"|222|| style="background:#ffffcc;"|-93|| style="background:#ffffcc;"|-|| style="background:#ffffcc;"|0|| style="background:#ffffcc;"|

|- align=center
|  style="text-align:left; background:;"|1998-2002
|  style="text-align:left; background:;"|-
| style="background:;"|-|| style="background:;"|-|| style="background:;"|-|| style="background:;"|-|| style="background:;"|-|| style="background:;"|-|| style="background:;"|-|| style="background:#;"|-|| style="background:;"|-|| style="background:;"|No Pro Borders Team

|- align=center
|  style="text-align:left; background:#ccffcc;"|2002–03 β 
|  style="text-align:left; background:#ccffcc;"|
| style="background:#ccffcc;"|4|| style="background:#ccffcc;"|2|| style="background:#ccffcc;"|0|| style="background:#ccffcc;"|2|| style="background:#ccffcc;"|172|| style="background:#ccffcc;"|68|| style="background:#ccffcc;"|+104|| style="background:#ccffcc;"|-|| style="background:#ccffcc;"|-|| style="background:#ccffcc;"|(lost to Montauban on aggregate)

|- align=center
|  style="text-align:left; background:#ffffcc;"|2003–04 β 
|  style="text-align:left; background:#ffffcc;"|4th in Pool 4
| style="background:#ffffcc;"|6|| style="background:#ffffcc;"|1|| style="background:#ffffcc;"|0|| style="background:#ffffcc;"|5|| style="background:#ffffcc;"|39|| style="background:#ffffcc;"|183|| style="background:#ffffcc;"|-144|| style="background:#ffffcc;"|0|| style="background:#ffffcc;"|4|| style="background:#ffffcc;"|

|- align=center
|  style="text-align:left; background:#ccffcc;"|2004–05 β 
|  style="text-align:left; background:#ccffcc;"|2nd round
| style="background:#ccffcc;"|4|| style="background:#ccffcc;"|2|| style="background:#ccffcc;"|0|| style="background:#ccffcc;"|2|| style="background:#ccffcc;"|242|| style="background:#ccffcc;"|84|| style="background:#ccffcc;"|+148|| style="background:#ccffcc;"|-|| style="background:#ccffcc;"|-|| style="background:#ccffcc;"|(lost to Clermont on aggregate)

|- align=center
|  style="text-align:left; background:#ccffcc;"|2005–06
|  style="text-align:left; background:#ccffcc;"|3rd in Pool 4
| style="background:#ccffcc;"|6|| style="background:#ccffcc;"|3|| style="background:#ccffcc;"|0|| style="background:#ccffcc;"|3|| style="background:#ccffcc;"|155|| style="background:#ccffcc;"|177|| style="background:#ccffcc;"|-22|| style="background:#ccffcc;"|3|| style="background:#ccffcc;"|15|| style="background:#ccffcc;"|

|- align=center
|  style="text-align:left; background:#ffffcc;"|2006–07
|  style="text-align:left; background:#ffffcc;"|3rd in Pool 6
| style="background:#ffffcc;"|6|| style="background:#ffffcc;"|1|| style="background:#ffffcc;"|0|| style="background:#ffffcc;"|5|| style="background:#ffffcc;"|121|| style="background:#ffffcc;"|166|| style="background:#ffffcc;"|-45|| style="background:#ffffcc;"|2|| style="background:#ffffcc;"|6|| style="background:#ffffcc;"|

|}

Notable former players

Scotland 
The following former Border Reivers players have represented Scotland at full international level.

Notable non-Scottish players
The following is a list of notable non-Scottish international representative former Border Reivers players:

Notable coaches
Steve Bates

See also
 Scottish Rugby Union
 Celtic League
 Heineken Cup
 European Challenge Cup
 Border Reivers
 South of Scotland rugby union team

References

External links
 Official site
 Unofficial Supporters Club site
 Borders secure Heineken spot with record victory - The Scotsman, May 27, 2006
 Border Reivers video vault on Channel XV
 Scottish rugby union fans forum

United Rugby Championship teams
Borders
Scottish Inter-District Championship teams
Rugby clubs established in 1999
Defunct Scottish rugby union Districts
Sports clubs disestablished in 2007
   
Galashiels
1999 establishments in Scotland